

Günther Hochgartz (10 July 1918 – 10 October 2005) was a West German politician. During World War II, he served as an officer in the Wehrmacht of Nazi Germany and was decorated with the Knight's Cross of the Iron Cross.

Awards and decorations
 Knight's Cross of the Iron Cross on 15 April 1944 as Hauptmann and Leader of the II./Grenadier-Regiment 187

References

Citations

Bibliography

 

1918 births
2005 deaths
People from Bocholt, Germany
Recipients of the Gold German Cross
Recipients of the Knight's Cross of the Iron Cross
Commanders Crosses of the Order of Merit of the Federal Republic of Germany
Christian Democratic Union of Germany politicians
People from the Province of Westphalia
Military personnel from North Rhine-Westphalia